The 2009–10 Serie A1 is the 65th season of Italian Championship (Italian Volleyball League) organized under the supervision of Federazione Italiana Pallavolo.

Teams

Champions
Italian Championship A1: Bre Banca Lannutti Cuneo
Italian Cup A1: Itas Diatec Trentino
Italian Supercup A1: CoprAtlantide Piacenza

European cups qualification
2010–11 CEV Champions League (3): Bre Banca Lannutti Cuneo, Itas Diatec Trentino, Sisley Treviso
2010–11 CEV Cup (1): Trenkwalder Modena
2010–11 CEV Challenge Cup (1): Lube Banca Marche Macerata

Italian supercup A1
Venue: Palasport "City of Frosinone", Frosinone, Lazio

|}

Italian cup A1

Regular season 1st half

|}

Final round

Quarterfinals

|}

Semifinals
Venue: Palasport, Montecatini Terme, Tuscany

|}

Final
Venue: Palasport, Montecatini Terme, Tuscany

|}

Italian championship A1

Regular season

|}

Playoffs

Quarterfinals

Itas Diatec Trentino (1) 3:0 Marmi Lanza Verona (8)

|}

Lube Banca Marche Macerata (5) 3:1 Trenkwalder Modena (4)

|}

Bre Banca Lannutti Cuneo (2) 3:0 CoprAtlantide Piacenza (7)

|}

Sisley Treviso (3) 3:1 Acqua Paradiso Monza (6)

|}

Semifinals

Itas Diatec Trentino (1) 3:1 Lube Banca Marche Macerata (5)

|}

Bre Banca Lannutti Cuneo (2) 3:1 Sisley Treviso (3)

|}

Final

Bre Banca Lannutti Cuneo (2) 1:0 Itas Diatec Trentino (1)
Venue: Futurshow Station, Casalecchio di Reno, Emilia-Romagna

|}

External links
Official website

Men's volleyball competitions in Italy
2009 in Italian sport
2010 in Italian sport